This is a series of lists by country. The lists generally cover topics related to sovereign countries; however, states with limited recognition are also included.

Topical country articles

Main articles

 
 Administrative divisions
 Politics

Others

 Current heads of state and government
 Election results
 Flags
 Intelligence agencies
 Legislatures
 Militaries
 National anthems
 National capitals
 National constitutions
 National emblems
 National governments
 National mottos
 Office-holders
 Political parties
 System of government

Topics sorted by country

 Airlines
 Area
 Battles
 Cathedrals
 Cemeteries
 Cities
 Education
 Emergency contraception
 Islands
 Maps
 Metro systems
 Monorail systems
 Music genres
 National parks
 Newspapers
 Nobel laureates
 Novelists
 Official languages
 People
 Population
 Pornography
 Prostitution
 Rail transport
 Railway companies
 Religions
 Schools
 Suburban and commuter rail systems
 Television
 Tram and light rail transit systems
 Universities and colleges
 Vegetarianism
 World Heritage Sites

Lists for most countries
Adjectival and demonymic forms of place names
Armed forces
Coats of arms
Country calling codes
Country-name etymologies
Divorce rate
FIPS country codes
Former national capitals
GDP
GDP per capita
Historical exchange rates to the USD
Human Development Index (HDI)
International rankings
Internet TLDs
List of IOC country codes
List of ISO 3166 country codes
Lists of most common surnames
Referendums by country
Social Progress Index
Sovereign states by year
Tallest structures
UN member states
Voting systems

Other

EU member states
Former countries in Europe after 1815
Ship prefixes
Timeline of country and capital changes

 Lists by country